SNF-related serine/threonine-protein kinase is an enzyme that in humans is encoded by the SNRK gene.

References 

8. Thirugnanam K, Cossette SM, Lu Q, Chowdhury SR, Harmann LM, Gupta A, Spearman AD, Sonin DL, Bordas M, Kumar SN, Pan AY, Simpson PM, Strande JL, Bishop E, Zou MH, Ramchandran R. Cardiomyocyte-Specific Snrk Prevents Inflammation in the Heart. J Am Heart Assoc. 2019 Nov 19;8(22):e012792. doi: 10.1161/JAHA.119.012792. Epub 2019 Nov 13. PMID: 31718444; PMCID: PMC6915262.

Further reading 

 
 
 
 
 
 
 

EC 2.7.11